The Air Is on Fire is a soundtrack album by the American director and musician David Lynch. It was released on March 15, 2007 on Strange World Music. The soundtrack was composed by Lynch and collaborator Dean Hurley and accompanied Lynch's exhibition of paintings, photographs and drawings of the same name at Fondation Cartier pour l'Art Contemporain in Paris, France, in 2007.

Originally issued on CD, a limited-edition LP of The Air Is on Fire was released in April 2014 on Sacred Bones Records as part of Record Store Day. The LP was limited to 2,000 copies.

Composition
In an interview on Arte Radio in 2007, Dean Hurley used various phrases to describe The Air Is on Fires sound, including "a large flashbulb paparazzi sound", "short drum machine phrases", "brief phrases of machines working", "dubbed industrial hip hop", "characteristic winds", "punch-presses pitched down", "train mechanisms and large steel-factory samples" and "metal structures that were welded together."

Reception

Writing for Pitchfork, critic Marc Masters gave The Air Is on Fire a positive review. Masters drew comparisons between the album's sound and the styles of Demdike Stare and the Haxan Cloak and said that "even at its densest, The Air Is on Fire is pretty simple sonically, which gives it a universal tone. It's not about cutting-edge techniques or never-heard-before concoctions. It's about using sound to tell a wordless story and evoke undefined emotions. On those counts, it succeeds thoroughly."

Track listing

Personnel
All personnel credits adapted from The Air Is on Fires album notes.

Performers
David Lynch – instrumentation, sound design
Dean Hurley – instrumentation, arrangement

Technical personnel
David Lynch – recording
Dean Hurley – recording, editing, mixing

Design personnel
David Lynch – design, cover art
Sacred Bones Design – additional design

References

External links

2007 soundtrack albums
David Lynch albums
Instrumental soundtracks
Sacred Bones Records soundtracks